Thornhill is a suburb of Southampton, United Kingdom, situated on the eastern border of the city and bounded by three major roads. According to the 2001 census the population was 11,460. The under 16s represent 23.4% of the population, 5% more than the city figure of 18.2%; the over 65s represent 17.4%, again, higher than the city average of 14.5%.

History
In 1954 the boundaries of Southampton were extended to include Millbrook, Redbridge, Harefield and part of Thornhill. Thornhill was a small estate of private homes, which was massively expanded in the 1960s by the building of council properties. A large proportion of the occupiers of the original houses are retired accounting for the previously mentioned higher than normal numbers. After the introduction of The right to buy scheme in the late 1980s, a considerable number of the council properties were purchased from Southampton City Council. Owner-occupiers represent 43.9% of properties according to the 2001 census compared to 47.5% local council tenure. The remainder are made up of Housing Association and privately rented homes. The main road through the estate is Hinkler Road, named in honour of its most famous resident, as is the pub! – Bert Hinkler who flew solo from England to Australia in 1928.

Recognised as an area of social deprivation, Thornhill was one of 39 areas around the country chosen in 1999 for the New Deal for Communities. This was controlled by a board of 12 local residents and 8 representatives of relevant agencies (police, primary health care, city council, chamber of commerce etc.) and was known as Thornhill Plus You. Almost £50 Million was available to invest in the area over a 10-year period which commenced in 2000. This was spent on a large number of diverse projects.

As part of the redevelopment of Thornhill, during the morning of Tuesday 29 June 2010, a turf-cutting ceremony signalled the start of construction at Eastpoint Centre in Burgoyne Road, Thornhill. The centre, now open, provides a hub for business and community alike. It boasts the latest conference facilities across a three-storey 3,770 sq m development. There is also training space, a social club and a restaurant area.

A succession strategy for the end of the 10-year programme was put in place resulting in the formation of Plus You Limited. The purpose of this was to ensure continued regeneration and benefit for the community of Thornhill.

Culture and community
Youth schemes such as the Thornhill Festival, which allows musical talent from the area to showcase their talents, Impact youth group and two active youth clubs are also available providing the activities for the higher than average number of young people in the area.

In June 2015, the notorious and infamous drug dealer Babak Rajabzadeh, was finally captured. According to The Daily Echo, Rajabzadeh was responsible for controlling all of Thornhill's cocaine supplies. Before his capture, his influence affected the surrounding areas, causing Thornhill residents to lose trust in their local police force.

Landmarks

Antelope Park
The Antelope Park was a run-down office block and Jewson's regional headquarters. It has been redeveloped into a £25m retail and entertainment complex, with Jewsons being relocated to a new building at the rear of the site.

Hinkler Parade
On 22 February 2010, The Hinkler Parade Regeneration Scheme took a step forward with the approval of £15 million project which would see the demolition of seventeen shops – many of which are boarded up – twenty-two flats, and a five-storey block of sixteen flats in Marston Road, and their replacement with 106 new homes – which would be a mix of rent, part buy-part rent and full ownership, 5 new shops and a community center. The property developers that have been granted by Southampton City Council are Barratt Homes and First Wessex.

On 22 March 2010, a ceremony took place at 12:30pm which marked the beginning of the Hinkler Parade Regeneration Project. Hinkler Parade will also be renamed to Prospect Place.

Education
There are three schools on the Estate: Hightown Primary School, Kane's Hill Primary School and Thornhill Primary School.

There is also a special needs primary school called Springwell School designated for pupils with minor learning difficulties including speech and language disorders, autism and challenging behaviour, which opened its doors to students in September 2007, though was not officially opened until March 2008.

Religious sites
There are two churches, Thornhill Baptist in Thornhill Park Road and St. Christopher's Parish Church on Hinkler Road. The Parish Chursh is adjacent to the main shopping area (which includes the all usual social amenities) and is located in the centre of the estate.

Sport

The Eastpoint Centre, a leisure, conference and sports facility, is in fact the faculty buildings of Hightown Secondary school, which closed in the mid-1980s, meaning that all secondary school pupils have to commute to one of several in bordering estates. This is currently under redevelopment.

References

External links
 Thornhill Baptist Church
 Hightown Primary School
 Kanes Hill Primary School 
 Thornhill Primary School
 Springwell School
 Eastpoint Centre
 Thornhill Festival
 Impact (youth group)

Areas of Southampton
Housing estates in Hampshire